Michael Twomey was an Irish independent politician. He was a member of Seanad Éireann from April to August 1938. He was elected to the 2nd Seanad in April 1938 by the Agricultural Panel. He lost his seat at the August 1938 Seanad election.

He stood unsuccessfully for Dáil Éireann as an independent candidate for the Cork West constituency at the 1943 general election.

References

Year of birth missing
Year of death missing
Independent members of Seanad Éireann
Irish farmers
Members of the 2nd Seanad
People from County Cork